Universidad Católica de Santiago de Guayaquil, UCSG, is a private, catholic, higher education center, along with Pontificia Universidad Católica del Ecuador in Ecuador.

History 
UCSG was created on May 17, 1962, at the request of the board of Catholic college pro presiding Bishop Cesar Antonio Mosquera Corral, Archbishop of Guayaquil, the jurist Dr. Leonidas Ortega Moreira and P. Joachim Flor Vásconez SJ, who were its founding authorities, as chancellor, first president and director, respectively. Constitutional President of the Republic, Dr. Carlos Julio Arosemena Monroy, through the respective Executive Decision # 936, approved the statute, and the Ministry of Education authorized its operation by Resolution # 1158.

At that time, among others, performed at the Governmental Body Dr. Santiago Castillo Barredo, Mr. Francisco Amador Ycaza, Archbishop Antonio Bermeo, Roger Bishop Beauge, the P. Jorge Mesía SJ, as Secretary of the Governmental Body and Dr. Fausto Idrovo Arcentales, secretary general. Dr. Hector Romero Menéndez (1962–66), Fr José Joaquín Flower (1962–65) and Raúl Díaz Maruri (1962–63) was the founding dean of Law, Philosophy and Engineering.

On June 6, 1962, i.e. at 19 days of being issued the Executive Agreement, began the first term of classes with the following faculties: Jurisprudence, Social and Political Sciences, Philosophy and Science Education Physical and Mathematical Sciences (School of Civil Engineering and Architecture). The courses were taught in the school building at night "April 20" of the Jesuits, located on the corner of Eloy Alfaro 1955 and Manabi, of this city, where he worked until 1966 when it opened in the main building campus, located at Km 1.5 Avenida Carlos Julio Arosemena Tola.

In 1963, the School of Economics was founded and attached to the Faculty of Law. Subsequently, the Governing Body, at its meeting on March 18, 1965, approved the creation of the School of Economics.

In 1965, the School of Architecture (formerly functioned as the school attached to the Faculty of Physical Sciences and Mathematics) was created. In 1967–68 they were created by the Institute of Technical Education for Development (Faculty since 26-IX-77), with the School of Animal and Electricity and Telecommunications, and the Faculty of Medicine. In 1969 he joined the School of Social Work (which operated since 1960 under the auspices of the Rotary Club of Guayaquil. In 1970 he authorized the operation of the Institute of Applied Arts (now Interior Design career) and in 1973 he joined the Faculty of Medical Sciences, School of Nursing "San Vicente de Paul" (which was created in 1974 by the Community of the Daughters of Charity and had been operating in Quito).

In 1985 he founded the School of Computer Systems Engineering at the Faculty of Engineering and, in the same year, authorized the operation of the Board of School of Law, Juris.

Graduate School of Medical Sciences Faculty was established in October 1986. According to current statute adopted in 2001, theRacereplace the termschool.

Colleges and careers

Faculty of Engineering 
After formal approval by the Original Status of the President of the Republic of that time, Dr. Carlos Julio Arosemena Monroy, Catholic University became operational on June 6, 1962, with the Faculty of Physical Sciences and Mathematics School of Civil Engineering and Architecture.

Later in 1965 broke the School of Architecture which was established in School, and on September 26, 1977, the University Council approved the new structural design of the university looked the same as the identification of Colleges including the College of Engineering with the School of Civil Engineering. It was clarified that the term faculty to an administrative entity-academic, semi-autonomous, which consists of schools. The schools are independent units of the Faculty, for the teaching of related subjects after the granting of professional and academic qualifications.

On May 4, 1981, the University Council approved the academic portion of the creation of the School of Computer Science and the May 10, 1985 the same agency official the initiation of activities of this new School of the Faculty of Engineering, scheme remains to date.

Since 1973 the Faculty of Engineering has its own building within the university campus and at various times have been gradually adding new buildings or renovations, according to academic requirements and physical space that circumstances have arisen.

It currently has the main building where it operates an auditorium, reading room and office of the Association of Students of Computer Systems Engineering at the 3rd. Level: 2nd classrooms. Level and General Secretariat staff room, Dean and Coordination in the 1st. level. It also has other buildings such as blocks Laboratory of Soil Hydraulic Materials and an adjoining building where is located the micro-computer lab and classrooms.

Careers 
 Civil Engineering
 Computer Systems Engineering

Faculty of Law 
The Faculty of Law including Race Race Law and Social Work, was established with the founding of the Catholic University of Santiago de Guayaquil in 1962. It is one of the oldest faculties and has been present throughout the history of Ecuador.

Their teachers were graduates and final character in many of the events that have changed the course of the country, are just some of them. It has graduated presidents, judges, prosecutors, senior government officials, writers, academics, prominent lawyers and humanists.

The Faculty of Law offers undergraduate, Diploma in Counseling and Family Therapy and in a few months a Masters in Commercial Law.

Careers 
 Law
 Social Work
 Counseling and Family Therapy

Faculty of Philosophy, Literature and Communication Sciences

Careers 
 Toddler Education
 Clinical Psychology
 Psychology
 Social Communication

School of Economics 
The Catholic University of Santiago de Guayaquil was founded on May 17, 1962. He began his first term with the Faculties of Law, Philosophy and Physical Sciences and Mathematics. It was in 1963 when the classes are taught at the college April 20, establishing the School of Economics as an academic unit attached to the Faculty of Law, during the Dean of the Dr. Hector Romero Menendez, who appoints a commission composed Econ. Hector Falconi Camba (+), Econ. Nicolas Escandon (+) and Econ. Jose Icaza Coronel, for the commission to design the curriculum of the new career. Econ was charged. Icaza selection of the first professors, including Dr. Miguel Babra Lyon, Econ. Carlos Cortez Castro, Dr. Alfredo Baquerizo Lince, Pedro Aguayo Cubillo. Subsequently, the then governing body of the Catholic University of Santiago de Guayaquil, at its meeting March 18, 1965, approved the establishment of the Faculty of Economics, the first Dean was Dr. Theodore Arízaga Vega. The new race would last six years. On 12 January 1966 establishing the specialization of Directors. Expertise that could be taken from the fourth year, being common the first three years and the last three specialization. In late 1977, when Mr. Luis Fernando Hidalgo Proaño, was president of the Student Association at the Faculty of Econ. Jose Icaza Coronel, student initiated the proposal for the creation of an Institute of Economic Research. Then the Rector is responsible, Dr. Galo García Feraud, approves the proposal, and the January 16, 1978, the University Council approved the creation of the Center for Economic Research, to function as a center attached to the Faculty of Economics, Administration and Audit.

In 1980 he managed the construction of the building now for the Dean, Faculty of Econ. Jorge Paez Egüez (+) and achieved a contribution of US$1,000,000 Ministry of Finance, management by the Econ. Luis F. Proaño Hidalgo, Secretary to the Minister of Finance Econ. Cesar Robalino, a contribution which is 80% of the construction of the building. It is then that since 1982, the School has its own building, because until then the classes were delivered in the University Main Building. On April 5, 1982, during the Dean of Econ. Jorge Paez Egüez (+), the University Council approved the creation of the specialization of Accounting and Auditing.

In 1985, efforts by the Secretary of Finance (Econ. Luis F. Hidalgo Proano) creates an item of $100,000 for the construction of an auditorium for the Faculty of Economics. For administrative arrangements of the university could not be concluded, and became what is now the administrative building of the Faculty.

On November 30, 1992, during the Dean of Mr. Mauro Segale Toscanini, the University Council approved the creation of the specialization of International Business Management, University of avalizada Tolousse of France, is a response to the need for personal prepared with knowledge of Economy, Trade, Management and Languages (English-French), expressed by different companies surveyed. This knowledge will facilitate the development of the functions of the Administrator in a globalized environment, where international forces affect even companies that operate in a country, must therefore include people who have mastered techniques of trade between countries. In the same Dean, microcomputers were purchased twenty-five DELL486-25 MHz.

During the current administration and in response to a latent need for training, the Dean appointed a commission formed by the exdecanos Econ. Mauro Toscanini and Econ. Carlos Cortez and Dr. Rodrigo Navia Insignares to explore the possibility of creating a Center for Continuing Education, whose aim was to give formal and informal training to graduates and the different members of society linked to the Industry, Trade and Finance. The board, on October 11, 1994, resolved to put into consideration before the University Council the proposed creation of the Centre for Continuing Education. University Council on January 2, 1995, approved the establishment of the Centre for Continuing Education (CEDUCAPE) as a unit attached to the Faculty of Economics, Management, Accounting and International Business Management. His first Executive Director is Dr. Rodrigo Navia Insignares.

On 10 deAbril 1995, University Council approved the draft Academic Reform and Macro microcurriculum the different specializations offered by the Faculty, reform in the broadest sense includes the reduction from five to four years of study, leave the first year core for all students and the second may choose the desired specialization. This reform starts from the 1995–1996 academic year for freshmen and will be progressively introduced every year. At the same meeting of University Council approved the name change of the specialization of Accounting and Auditing Public Accounts.

On April 27, 1998, University Council approved the reform bill and microcurriculum Macro Academic Faculty of racing Economics, Management and Accounting, which consists of the annual regime change (Amendment 1995) to semester system, i.e. 8 cycles included: 4 basic cycles and 4 cycles of expertise, plus the development of Thesis or Project. Increases the number of hours of preprofessional practice (Internship) from 240 hours to 320 hours, strengthening the area of English racing becoming bilingual. This reform starts from May 1998 with the first basic cycle and will be implemented progressively in each semester.

To date February/2000 has completed the first 4 semesters of the new reform (1998) and starts the 5th May/2000. semesters.

School of Medicine 
In meeting the honorable regulatory governing body of the Catholic University of Santiago de Guayaquil, on January 5, 1968, attended by: His Excellency the Archbishop, Chancellor Archbishop Cesar Antonio Mosquera C., Dr. Leonidas Ortega Moreira Catholic University Rector, Dr. Miguel A. Astudillo Peña Vice Chancellor, the Hi.L.M.O. Mauricio Beauge, and Don Gustavo Vallarino in designating a committee to prepare a report on the establishment of the Faculty of Medicine.
On September 18, 1968, the governing body aware of the report submitted by the commission to draft pro-medical school. Based on that study, the governing body resolves to that power, asking for approval to the "placet" in S. Congregation for Catholic Studies in Rome.

The governing body unanimously decided to appoint as dean Dr. Jose Manrique Izquieta. Accept the donation of the President of the Board. Mr. Don Gonzalo Cornejo Icaza to buy land owned by the Board of Charities, Gonzalez Alamiro authorizing the architect to proceed with the surveying for the building of the Faculty of Medicine and nominate to the Academic Council for the development of curriculum.

On April 1, 1968, opened the first academic year with a curriculum of progressive, structured in six courses, three of which were organized by 61 cycles with materials organized into five courses, plus the 7th year of rotating internship.

Shortly after beginning operation, and was starting the lifting of the plans for what would be the faculty building, project architect corresponded make Alamiro González and was swiftly executed under the direction of Mr. Francisco Amador, thereby meeting the June 18, 1971 classes began in the new building that is the same as the power holds up today.

As of November 20, 1973 the Faculty of Medical Sciences provides graduates a new career, nursing, with the start of the courses in the Nursing "San Vicente de Paul."

On May 6, 1982, the Board of Faculty of Medical Sciences, chaired by Dr. Gustavo Cornejo Montalvo approved the creation of the Graduate School designed since the formation of specialists and subspecialists Professional Health Sciences.

In the year 1 998 is set administratively medicine career that until then operated under the direct control of the faculty.

Faculty of Architecture and Design 
On March 18, 1965, Governing Body of the Pontificia Universidad Católica de Santiago de Guayaquil, approved the establishment of the Faculty of Architecture which had functioned so far as the School of Architecture attached to the Faculty of Physical Sciences and Mathematics.

In 1987 with the establishment of the Research Program in architectural history PROHA start a fruitful period of research and contribution in areas of architectural history and conservation of built heritage, as well as active participation in national specialist forums and international.

In 2000, reforms of the Staff College, provides the constitution of the Faculty of Architecture with courses in Architecture and Interior Design, and its first director Gonzalo Robalino Architect and Dec. Patiño Pilar Torres de Guevara, respectively.

School of Business Specialty

Faculty of Technical Education for the development 
The Faculty of Technical Education for Development, began operating as a unit, attached to the Rector of the Catholic University of Guayaquil in 1975, serving as the Technical Institute.

Subsequently, in September 1977 by University Council resolution, created the Technical Education Faculty Development as an alternative for training middle level technicians, who inserted in agriculture to develop technologies that change the archaic procedures for handling of farm animals, as well as agriculture in general. Similarly, for the purpose of assisting in the implementation of new technologies in the areas of Electricity and Telecommunications.

Later in the period of Mr. Ing Eudoro rector de la Jara Cevallos, the College integrates academic structure, the School of Electricity, with the average technological level.

In the administration of Mr. Mr. Hector Rodriguez Gilbert, acting dean, period 1989–1991, they built the building of the Faculty, thanks to the treasurer of the management authority to the Rector Dr. Gustavo Noboa Bejarano Ms. Coello Vice Chancellor Dr. Nila Velásquez, the unconditional support of each and every one of the members of the University Council.

Faculty of Arts & Humanities 
The Faculty of Arts and Humanities was established on May 23, 2005 (Resolution NO. 012-05) with the self-financing mode with four areas: ARTS, HUMANITIES, LANGUAGES AND TECHNOLOGY.

The Faculty of Arts and Humanities is conceived as an academic unit in which careers are linked and training programs, structured on the basis of the relationship among four subsystems: Arts, Humanities, Foreign Language and Technology, each which is made up races and training programs related specifically to them. Subsystems in the academic and administrative order are considered axes around which they develop and mainstream vocational training schemes in the Faculty.

See also

List of universities in Ecuador

References 
Facultades y Carreras. Universidad Católica de Santiago de Guayaquil. Retrieved on November 8, 2010.

 
Educational institutions established in 1962
Catholic universities and colleges in Ecuador
Universities in Ecuador
Buildings and structures in Guayaquil
1962 establishments in Ecuador